Rhiannon Adam (born 1985) is an Irish photographic artist and writer, living in London.
Her books include Dreamlands, Wastelands (2014) and Big Fence / Pitcairn Island (2022). Adam is one of eight crew members for the dearMoon project, a lunar tourism mission and art project scheduled to launch in 2023.

Life and work
Adam was born in Cork, Ireland and lives in Hackney, London.

In 2015, she was selected for the Journey of a Lifetime programme, run by the Royal Geographical Society and BBC's Radio 4. She spent three months in the Pitcairn Islands, and drew on these experiences to create a radio piece and a book, Big Fence / Pitcairn Island (2022).

Dreamlands, Wastelands (2014) is about the seaside resorts frequented by the British, focused on Benidorm and Margate. It is made using outdated Polaroid instant film.

Adam has also published the book Polaroid: The Missing Manual, The Complete Creative Guide (2017).

In 2022, she was named as one of eight crew members on the dearMoon project, a lunar tourism mission and art project scheduled to launch in 2023.

Publications

Books by Adam
Dreamlands, Wastelands. Jane & Jeremy, 2014. Edition of 100 copies.
Polaroid: The Missing Manual, The Complete Creative Guide. Thames and Hudson, 2017. .
Big Fence / Pitcairn Island. Blow Up, 2022. With an essay by Gem Fletcher. . Edition of 800 copies.

Other publications by Adam
Big Fence / Pitcairn Island. 2018. Newspaper format. With text by Gemma Padley. Edition of 100 copies.
Updated edition. 2020. Edition of 100 copies.

References

External links

21st-century Irish photographers
Irish women photographers
1985 births
Living people